is a 2012 Japanese television drama series. It is based on the novel Perfect Blue by Miyuki Miyabe.

It debuted on 8 October 2012. The theme song of the series was sung by Kou Shibasaki.

Cast
Miori Takimoto as Kayoko Hasumi 
Aya Hirayama as Nana Kimizuka
Kensei Mikami as Shunichi Miyamoto
Kumiko Shiratori as Momoko Nagashima
Taishi Nakagawa as Shinya Morooka
Haori Takahashi as Itoko Hasumi
Kaori Asō as Ruriko Ejima
Eiichiro Funakoshi as Masa (voice)
Toshie Negishi as Michiko Miura
Tetsu Watanabe as Tetsu Fujinaga
Yasufumi Terawaki as Yūsuke Shiina
Naomi Zaizen as Kyōko Hasumi

References

External links
 
 
 パーフェクト・ブルー(2012) at allcinema 

Japanese drama television series
2012 Japanese television series debuts
TBS Television (Japan) dramas
Television shows based on Japanese novels
2012 Japanese television series endings